TriMet transit centers are defined by TriMet as "major transit hub[s] served by several bus or rail lines". These transit centers are often key areas for accessing public transportation throughout the extended Portland metropolitan area.

Current transit centers

Former transit centers

Note: Rose Quarter Transit Center was originally named Coliseum Transit Center.  It was renamed in 1994, but the location remained the same, and the facilities did not change at that time.

See also

 List of MAX Light Rail stations

References

External links
 TriMet.org

TriMet transit centers
TriMet transit centers